Socialist Left (IS), officially registered as the Left for a Socialist Option (Izquierda por una Opción Socialista), is a Trotskyist political party in Argentina. It was founded in 2006 as a split from the Socialist Workers' Movement. It is the Argentine section of International Workers' Unity – Fourth International. It is one of three parties that make up the Workers' Left Front.

Members include Liliana Olivero, a former deputy in the provincial legislature in Córdoba Province, Argentina, Angélica Lagunas, a provincial deputy in Neuquén Province, Mercedes de Mendieta, a deputy in the Autonomous City of Buenos Aires, and Graciela Calderón, a deputy in Buenos Aires Province.

References

External links
Official website

Communist parties in Argentina
International Workers' Unity – Fourth International
Trotskyist organisations in Argentina